FC Baník Ostrava is a football club from the Silesian part of the city of Ostrava, Czech Republic.

Founded in 1922 as SK Slezská Ostrava, Baník has won numerous national and international trophies.

History

Formation and history to 1937 

The club was founded on 8 September 1922 as SK Slezská Ostrava, when 20 activists signed the establishment treaty in the U Dubu restaurant. The signatories were mostly poor coal miners from the Kamenec coal mining settlement in Ostrava. The founders were Karel Aniol, Arnošt Haberkiewicz, Petr Křižák, František Mruzek and Jaroslav Horák.

SK Slezská Ostrava was a poor club, raising money for the functioning of the club was a common concern. It didn't have its own playing field and was forced to loan fields from wealthier clubs. The first field of its own was built in autumn of 1925 at Kamenec. It was however stony and did not meet requirements of the football officials. In 1934 club activists succeeded in renting the land at Stará střelnice from regional wealthy industrialist Count Wilczek. During the summer of 1934 a new field was built there. Many workers volunteered to help with the construction for free. Workers and coal miners often came directly from shifts to build the field.

SK Slezská Ostrava began to compete with other teams in the league system in the spring of 1923. It started in the lowest division (III. třída župy) and was promoted to the higher division the same year. It took, however, some time for the club to reach the highest divisions of football in Czechoslovakia. In 1934 the club won promotion to the Moravian-Silesian Division, one of the highest leagues in the country. The promotion made SK Slezská Ostrava a popular team in the city and public interest was rising. The 1935 derby against Slovan Ostrava was watched at Stará střelnice by 5,400 spectators.

From 1937 to 1952 
The First League in Czechoslovakia was dominated by Prague teams at that time, which were advanced in all aspects. Promotion to the First League was, therefore, a big success for SK Slezská Ostrava. In 15 years the team advanced from the obscure minnows to the highest level of football in the country. The first league match at Stará střelnice was played on 22 August 1937 against 1. ČsŠK Bratislava. In the second match, the newcomer team faced famous Sparta Prague in Prague. Though Sparta's roster was full of national team players, Baník won 3–2 and caused an immediate sensation. SK Slezská Ostrava survived three seasons in the First League before being relegated in 1940.

SK Slezská Ostrava played in the Division until 1943, when it was again promoted to the First League. Promotion to the highest league sparked even stronger interest for football in local people. Later, famed opera singer Rudolf Asmus even sang the new anthem for the club. In the 1943–44 season the home attendances of SK Slezská Ostrava reached the highest level so far. The match against Slavia Prague was attended by 33,000 people.

From 1952 to 1967 
In 1952 the club adopted the name DSO Baník Ostrava. Since then the name went only through slight changes. In the 1954 season, Baník achieved its biggest league success so far, finishing second in the league after Sparta. In 1959 Baník played for the last time at the old Stará střelnice stadium. Stará střelnice did not meet the requirements set by the football association. The pitch was not grassy, but covered with slag, which was also a reason to close down the stadium. The new Bazaly stadium was constructed in 1959 in Slezská Ostrava, and was opened on 19 April 1959.

In the 1965–66 season Baník was weakened by the generation change. It ended 13th in the league table and was relegated to the Second League. A year later Baník was again promoted to the top division. Since then Baník has played exclusively in the top flight of football in the country.

The Golden Era 
In 1972/73 and 1977/78 Baník won the Czechoslovak Cup. In the 1975-76 season, the club won the Czechoslovak league for the first time.

The team's squad was stable in the Golden Era years. The best players like Lička and Vojáček were regularly playing for the national team. Others like Radimec, Rygel, Němec and Šreiner played also for the Olympic team. In the 1979–80 season Baník won its second Czechoslovakian title, finishing five points ahead of Zbrojovka Brno. In the 1980–81 season of the UEFA European Cup Baník reached the quarter-finals, where it was knocked out by Bayern Munich. In the same season, Baník also won the First League again. For the next two seasons, Baník finished second in the league table. After the 1982–83 season, coach Hadamczik resigned, thus symbolically ending the Golden Era of the club.

From 1983 
In the following years, Baník was unable to reach the highest positions in the league. The team was undergoing another generation change and young players did not maintain their performance for the whole season. Baník however regularly appeared in the upper part of the league table. In the 1988–89 and 1989–90 seasons it finished second in the league. In 1991, Baník won the Czechoslovak Cup by beating Spartak Trnava 6–1 in the final.

In the 2003–04 season they won the Czech Republic league.

From 2016: the Václav Brabec era 
In the 2015–16 season they were under financial distress and were bought by Czech millionaire Václav Brabec who originated from Kroměříž. They were relegated to the Czech Second League for the 2016–17 season.
In the 2016–17 season they would finish 2nd and started their rebuild to compete in the Czech First League for the 2017–18 season.

With no youth training facilities before the new ownership, under Václav Brabec the team began investing 150 million Kč in three facilities.

1) A partnership in 2017 with K-9 Grade School of J. Šoupal, where they have at their disposal 2 natural fields and 1 artificial field for the youth development.

2) building (expected complete early 2019) new training grounds at Vista that will enable the team to have 2 more artificial fields and 1 natural field for their youth teams.

3) The team is working with the Dvořák High School that will enable their athletes to finish a degree in sports management as well as all 20–25 individuals to train together.

The team has also received the rights to an Academy that will practice at the new city-owned Bazaly facility that is being transformed into 5 practice fields for the youth.

Václav Brabec hired former Baník Ostrava star and home-grown player Marek Jankulovski to take over the role of Dušan Vrťo as the teams Sport Director. Jankulovski has brought in a few players such as Daniel Holzer, Patrizio Stronati and Adam Jánoš for the 2018–19 season.

In the 2020–21 season Marek Jankulovski has stepped down from his role to take the Chairman Board of Directors role. Milan Baroš has retired. Acquisitions before the 2020/21 campaign came from FC Slovácko in Jan Juroška and Tomáš Zajíc. The new team kit provider became Puma who won the contract over existing kit manufacturer Adidas.

Stadium
Former stadium Bazaly was their home from 1953 to 2015 and had a capacity approximate 17500, but in the golden years over 20,000 occupants of standing room only were a common sight.

Currently, the Bazaly site is being transformed into a Youth Academy that will have 5 training fields.

Their stadium is the Městský stadion – Vítkovice Aréna, which has a capacity of 15,275.

Future: There is some talk that the city will build an all soccer stadium in the area formerly occupied by the coal mine Zárubek. Though the plans are in the initial stages with no expected construction time.

Supporters

In the late 2000s Baník had attendances higher than most within the Czech First League.

Ultra supporters of Baník call themselves Chachaři, which means "bad boys" in the local dialect. Some of the ultras' songs contain lyrics proudly demonstrating willingness to not only sing, but also fight for their club. Baník's ultras have made friendships over the years, and in 2006 celebrated 10 years of partnership with 2nd division Poland club, GKS Katowice. The celebration took the form of a game between the two teams, organised by the clubs' directors. The fixture took place at GKS's stadium, where throughout the 90 minutes the opposing sets of fans sung one another's songs. At the end of the game, both sets of fans climbed over metal fences in order to race onto the pitch come the final whistle to embrace and exchange scarves.

Players

Current squad
.

Out on loan

Former players

Player records in the Czech First League
.
Highlighted players are in the current squad.

Most appearances

Most goals

Most clean sheets

Managers

 Glass (1923–35)
 Karel Nenál (Feb 1936 – Sept 1936)
 Karel Böhm (Sept 1936 – Feb 1937)
 Karel Hromadník (Feb 1937 – Sept 1937)
 Ladislav Holeček (Oct 1937 – Dec 1937)
 Vilém Lugr (Jan 1938)
 Karel Böhm (Jan 1938 – March 1938)
 Karel Texa (March 1938 – April 1938)
 Karel Böhm (April 1938 – June 1938)
 Zdeněk Stefflik (July 1938 – June 1939)
 Antonín Křišťál (June 1939 – Jan 1940)
 Karel Böhm (Jan 1940 – May 1941)
 Evžen Šenovský (May 1941 – Aug 1941)
 Antonín Rumler (Aug 1941 – Aug 1942)
 Václav Horák (Sept 1942 – Aug 1943)
 František Jurek (Aug 1943 – Aug 1945)
 František Bělík (Sept 1945 – Feb 1946)
 František Kuchta (Feb 1946 – June 1946)
 Josef Kuchynka (June 1946 – March 1948)
 Jan Gavač (March 1948 – May 1948)
 Václav Horák (May 1948 – Jan 1949)
 Miroslav Bartoš (Jan 1949 – Oct 1949)
 František Bičiště (Oct 1949 – Sept 1950)
 Jaroslav Šimonek (Sept 1950 – Feb 1951)
 Rudolf Vytlačil (March 1951 – Jan 1952)
 Bedřich Šafl (Feb 1952 – Nov 1952)
 Jaroslav Šimonek (Dec 1952 – Feb 1956)
 František Szedlacsek (Feb 1956 – April 1957)
 Antonín Honál (April 1957 – May 1957)
 František Bičiště (June 1957 – June 1958)
 Jaroslav Vejvoda (July 1958 – July 1960)
 František Bufka (Aug 1960 – Dec 1964)
 Zdeněk Šajer (Jan 1965 – Dec 1965)
 František Bičiště (Jan 1966 – June 1966)
 Jiří Křižák (July 1966 – Dec 1966)
 Jozef Čurgaly (Jan 1967 – July 1967)
 Oldřich Šubrt (July 1967 – Aug 1969)
 Jiří Rubáš (Aug 1969 – June 1970)
 František Ipser (July 1970 – Aug 1971)
 Zdeněk Stanco (Aug 1971 – Dec 1971)
 Karol Bučko (Jan 1972 – Aug 1972)
 František Šindelář (Aug 1972 – Oct 1972)
 Tomáš Pospíchal (Oct 1972 – Dec 1975)
 Jiří Rubáš (Jan 1976 – Dec 1977)
 Evžen Hadamczik (Jan 1978 – June 1983)
 Stanislav Jarábek (July 1983 – June 1984)
 Josef Kolečko (July 1984 – June 1986)
 Milan Máčala (July 1986 – June 1990)
 Jaroslav Gürtler (July 1990 – June 1992)
 Ivan Kopecký (July 1992 – Nov 1992)
 Jaroslav Janoš (Nov 1992 – Dec 1992)
 Verner Lička (Dec 1992 – April 1995)
 Jaroslav Janoš (April 1995 – June 1995)
 Ján Zachar (July 1995)
 Jaroslav Jánoš (July 1995 – Aug 1995)
 Ján Zachar (Sept 1995 – July 1996)
 Petr Uličný (July 1996 – Sept 1997)
 Verner Lička (Sept 1997 – March 2000)
 Rostislav Vojáček (March 2000 – June 2000)
 Milan Bokša (July 2000 – Nov 2000)
 Jaroslav Gürtler (Nov 2000 – April 2001)
 Verner Lička (May 2001)
 Jozef Jarabinský (June 2001 – May 2002)
 Erich Cviertna (June 2002 – April 2003)
 Pavel Vrba (May 2003)
 František Komňacký (June 2003 – Oct 2004)
 Jozef Jarabinský (Oct 2004 – Aug 2005)
 Pavel Hapal (Aug 2005 – June 2006)
 Karel Večeřa (July 2006 – April 2009)
 Verner Lička (interim) (April 2009 – June 2009)
 Miroslav Koubek (June 2009 – Oct 2010)
 Verner Lička (Oct 2010 – Nov 2010)
 Karol Marko (Nov 2010 – July 2011)
 Pavel Malura (July 2011 – March 2012)
 Radoslav Látal (March 2012 – Oct 2012)
 Martin Pulpit (Oct 2012 – May 2013)
 Martin Svědík (May 2013 – Dec 2013)
 František Komňacký (Dec 2013 – April 2014)
 Tomáš Bernady (April 2014 – Dec 2014)
 Petr Frňka (Dec 2014 – June 2015)
 Radomír Korytář (June 2015 – Jan 2016)
 Vlastimil Petržela (Jan 2016 – May 2017)
 Radim Kučera (June 2017 – March 2018)
 Bohumil Páník (March 2018 – Dec 2019)
 Luboš Kozel (Dec 2019 – Feb 2021)
 Ondřej Smetana (Feb 2021 – April 2022)
 Tomáš Galásek (April 2022 – June 2022 )
 Pavel Vrba (July 2022 – October 2022)
 Pavel Hapal (October 2022 – )

History in domestic competitions

 Seasons spent at Level 1 of the football league system: 25
 Seasons spent at Level 2 of the football league system: 1
 Seasons spent at Level 3 of the football league system: 0
 Seasons spent at Level 4 of the football league system: 0

Czech Republic

History in European competitions since 1993–94

Honours

Domestic
Czechoslovak First League / Czech First League
Champions: 1975–76, 1979–80, 1980–81, 2003–04
Runners-up (6): 1954, 1978–79, 1981–82, 1982–83, 1988–89, 1989–90
Czechoslovak Cup/Czech Cup
Winners: 1972–73, 1977–78, 1990–91, 2004–05
Runners-up: 1978–79, 2003–04, 2005–06, 2018–19

European
Mitropa Cup
Winners: 1988–89
Mitropa Super Cup
Winners: 1989
European Cup
Quarter-finalists: 1980–81
Cup Winners' Cup
Semi-finalists: 1978–79
UEFA Cup
Quarter-finalists: 1974–75

Club records

Czech First League records

Best position: 1st (2003–04)
Worst position: 16th (2015–16)
Biggest home win: Ostrava 6–0 Plzeň (2005–06)
Biggest away win: Teplice 0–5 Ostrava (2022–23)
Biggest home defeat: Ostrava 1–5 Sparta (2000–01), Ostrava 0–4 Liberec (2004–05), Ostrava 0–4 Jablonec (2013–14), Ostrava 0–4 Plzeň (2015–16)
Biggest away defeat: Slavia 7–0 Ostrava (2002–03)

References

Bibliography

External links

Fan site

 
Football clubs in the Czech Republic
Association football clubs established in 1922
Ostrava, Banik
Ostrava, Banik
Sport in Ostrava
Ostrava, Banik
Mining association football clubs in the Czech Republic